Leandro Macías Infante (born ) is a Cuban male volleyball player. He was part of the Cuba men's national volleyball team at the 2014 FIVB Volleyball Men's World Championship in Poland. He played for Santiago de Cuba.

Clubs
 Santiago de Cuba (2014)

References

1990 births
Living people
Cuban men's volleyball players
Place of birth missing (living people)